The Palazzo Melzi d'Eril is a neoclassical-style palace located on Via Manin #21-23 in Milan, region of Lombardy, Italy.

History
The palace was designed by Giocondo Albertolli, while Giacomo Moraglia to design the facade. At one time the palace had a large garden attached. The base has pink hewn stone, while the upper floors have a sober retitive structure with a large balcony over the entrance.
. A distinct Palazzo Mezi d'Eril was erected in 1483 in Vaprio d'Adda.

References

Palaces in Milan
Neoclassical architecture in Milan